This article shows the rosters of all participating teams at the men's field hockey tournament at the 2019 Pan American Games in Lima, Peru. Rosters can have a maximum of 16 athletes.

Age and caps as of 29 July 2019 and clubs for which they played in the 2018–19 season.

Pool A

Argentina
Argentina announced their squad on 12 July 2019.

Head Coach: Germán Orozco

Chile

Cuba

Trinidad and Tobago

Pool B

Canada
Canada announced their squad on 17 June 2019.

Head coach: Paul Bundy

Mexico

Peru

United States
The United States announced their squad on 9 July 2019.

Head coach: Rutger Wiese

References

Rosters